Arthur Holmes Jr.  (born 12 May 1931) is a retired major general in the United States Army. He served as Commanding General of the United States Army Tank-Automotive Command.

References

1931 births
Living people
United States Army generals